This article lists the aerial port squadrons of the United States Air Force. The purpose of an aerial port squadron is to arrange and carry out Air Force logistical functions such as processing cargo, loading equipment, rigging for airdrop, and packing parachutes.

Aerial port squadrons

See also
List of United States Air Force squadrons

References

Aerial Port